Adriano Biasella (born 1 September 1980) is a retired Italian tennis player.

Biasella has a career high ATP singles ranking of 389 achieved on 19 November 2007. He also has a career high doubles ranking of 342 achieved on 23 July 2007.

He won his only ATP Challenger Tour title at the 2006 AON Open Challenger doubles competition in Genoa.

ATP Challenger and ITF Futures finals

Singles: 7 (1–6)

Doubles: 9 (4–5)

References

External links
 
 

1980 births
Living people
Italian male tennis players
21st-century Italian people